Kaomi (died 1833) was the half Hawaiian, half Tahitian, aikāne partner of King Kamehameha III, who named the young man the "engrafted king" (Ke-lii-kui) of the Kingdom of Hawaii. His father, Moe, who was a native to Borabora and mother, Ka-hua-moa, a native Hawaiian woman. Kaomi was not only the aikāne to Kau-i-ke-aouli but also close friend to Kaʻahumanuʻs brother, Ka-hekili Keʻe-au-moku.

The time of Kaomi (Ka wa ia Kaomi) 

He soon became close to the King due to his high level of education but also his skill in the art of healing. It is said that Kaomi could diagnose a disease by feeling the body of any individual and could thereafter prescribe the appropriate medicine to treat it. He had acquired these skills from Boki and Kaʻoʻo.With Kaomiʻs advice to the King proven to be true, along with his capabilities to entertainingly tell amusing stories, landed him favor with the King. Soon after, Kaomi received the title of “joint king, joint ruler” (moi kuʻi, aupuni kuʻi). In addition, appointed chiefs, warriors, and guards helped to develop an honorable name for Kaomi. With this title also came the responsibility and privilege to grant or deny any chief, citizen, or member of the kingʻs household land, clothing, money or anything desired for that matter. With Kaomi, remained the power to give or lend for the government.

Because Kaomi and Kamehameha III were aikane, there is speculation that Kaomi's relationship with the king may have lead to Kamehameha III's decision to rebel against the wishes of Western colonizers and revived previously suppressed Hawaiian traditions that included hula, dancing, gambling, various forms of love-making, and the consumption of liquor. With the exception of Waialua district, the liquor distilleries were again opened. 
Reportedly, people from all over the islands of Hawaiʻi, Maui and Kauaʻi poured into Oʻahu due to marriage laws not being observed in comparison to other islands where the law of Kau-i-ke-aouli was enforced.

The period would be called "The time of Kaomi". He held this position for a small period before being removed due to pressure from the Calvinist Church in 19th century Hawaii. Originally, Kaomi was a Protestant minister in the Royal Court of Kaʻahumanu, but he left the ministry when he began his relationship with the King. After the death of Kaʻahumanu, Kamehameha III would name Kīnaʻu as the next Kuhina Nui. Kamehameha was distraught by the loss of his lover. The Christian community would blame Kaomi for many of the vices during this period.

The removal of Kaomi 

With the “non-christian” like behavior that Kau-i-ke-aouli demonstrated, the plan to remove Kaomi would begin. The entire blame of Kamehameha IIIʻs conduct was placed on Kaomi by many Christian chiefs of that time. Soon after, it was Chief Kaikioʻewa (a kahu to the King) and Hoapili who hatched a secret plan to remove Kaomiʻs power by killing him. After kidnapping Kaomi, Chief Kaikioʻewa ordered a servant named Kaihuhanuna to tie Kaomiʻs hands behind his back and club him to death. When Kīnaʻu protested, the King rushed in and fought with Kaikioʻewa to save Kaomi. King Kamehameha III took Kaomi home to protect him, but Kaomi died within the year in 1833. His cause of death remains a mystery, but poison and disease are the most likely. Kamehameha III's grief was great after this loss. During this series of events, Kaikioʻewa accused the monarch of abandoning his leadership responsibilities due to his irresponsible self-indulgence in “evil” ways.

References

History of Hawaii
Hawaii
History
Royalty of the Hawaiian Kingdom
19th century in LGBT history
1833 deaths